Agonopterix melancholica is a moth of the family Depressariidae. It is found in Romania and Russia.

The wingspan is 21–23 mm.

References

External links
lepiforum.de

Moths described in 1917
Agonopterix
Moths of Europe